Lieutenant Starbuck of the Colonial Service, played by Dirk Benedict, is a fictional character in the 1978 science fiction television series Battlestar Galactica. Starbuck is a Viper starfighter pilot, gambler, womanizer and smoker of "fumerellos" (cigars). He is involved with Lieutenant Athena and socialator Cassiopeia, and best friend of Captain Apollo.

Fictional character history
Orphaned at a very young age in the Cylon attack on Umbra, a small agro community on Caprica at the edge of the thorn forest in yahren 7322, Starbuck never knew his parents. The man known as Chameleon, portrayed by Fred Astaire in the episode "The Man with Nine Lives", is discovered to be Starbuck's father, but Chameleon never reveals this fact to his son, instead trusting only Cassiopeia with this knowledge.

Starbuck is very close to the family of Commander Adama, who refers to Starbuck as a man "he loves like a son" in Galactica 1980s "The Return of Starbuck".

Starbuck was well liked and had close friendships with some of the other colonial viper pilots such as Flight Sergeant Jolly and Lieutenant Boomer.

Starbuck is renowned as a fighter pilot but nonetheless manages to crash a Viper four times, in "Saga of a Star World", "The Long Patrol", "The Young Warriors", and "The Return of Starbuck"; to crash a shuttle at least once, in "Gun on Ice Planet Zero"; or get into a difficult situation in a dogfight.

Starbuck returned for one episode, "The Return of Starbuck", in Galactica 1980. In this episode (which is Dirk Benedict's personal favorite out of every Galactica episode he appeared in), Starbuck is shot down by Cylon raiders and crashes on a remote planet. "The Wheel of Fire", an unproduced Galactica 1980 episode, reveals that Starbuck was eventually rescued by the beings from the Ship of Lights and that the entire affair of Starbuck finding Angela, delivering her child, and sending him to the Colonial Fleet was engineered by them, to test whether Starbuck was worthy to join them. Starbuck passes the test and becomes one of the Ship's crew.

Starbuck reappears in Richard Hatch's original Galactica novels, described as still the best pilot in the fleet, even though over 10 years have passed since the last episode and the start of the novel series. He and Cassiopeia have a daughter named Dalton, who becomes a fighter pilot. He also appears in the Maximum Press comic book series published in the 1990s, with one story seeing him stranded on a deserted planet and having to fight to survive, much like the episode "The Return of Starbuck". Due to licensing issues, his likeness isn't based on Dirk Benedict.

Origins of name
The name of the character Starbuck is derived from Moby-Dick. In the novel, it is the name of the first mate of the whaling ship the Pequod.

Reception
TV Guide ranked Starbuck # 21 on its "25 Greatest Sci-Fi Legends of All Time" list.

See also 
Kara "Starbuck" Thrace, Lieutenant Starbuck's analog in the reimagined Battlestar Galactica.

References

External links 
Starbuck at Battlestar Wiki

Battlestar Galactica (1978) characters
Galactica 1980 characters
Fictional lieutenants